District 1 is the first district in the Arkansas House of Representatives. Its current representative is Carol Dalby.

List of representatives

References

Arkansas House of Representatives districts